Carabus perrini perrini is a subspecies of black-coloured beetle from the subfamily Carabinae that is endemic to Ukraine.

References

perrini perrini
Beetles described in 1831
Endemic fauna of Ukraine
Beetles of Europe